Palmer Marion Hildebrand (December 23, 1884 – January 25, 1960) was a catcher in Major League Baseball. Nicknamed "Pete", he played for the St. Louis Cardinals in 1913.

References

External links

1884 births
1960 deaths
Major League Baseball catchers
St. Louis Cardinals players
Baseball players from Ohio
Danville Speakers players
New London Planters players
Syracuse Stars (minor league baseball) players